Ridha Charfeddine (born 2 July 1952) is a Tunisian politician and sportsmanager. He is an MP since October 2014.

Career
Charfeddine was born in Sousse on 2 July 1952. He has been chairman of Étoile Sportive du Sahel since 4 May 2012.

In the October 2014 parliamentary elections he was elected to the Assembly of the Representatives of the People for Nidaa Tounes.

On 8 October 2015 Charfeddine survived an assassination attempt near Sousse when the car he was travelling in was shot at various times.

References

1952 births
Living people
Members of the Assembly of the Representatives of the People
Nidaa Tounes politicians
People from Sousse
Tunisian sportspeople